Shirley MacLaine is an American actress known for her work in film and television.

MacLaine's acting debut came with Alfred Hitchcock's The Trouble with Harry (1955). She appeared in Around the World in 80 Days (1956), and Ocean's 11 (1960), before making her star turning role in Billy Wilder's acclaimed drama The Apartment (1960) opposite Jack Lemmon. Her performance brought her much critical acclaim and awards attention with her earning an Academy Award nomination. She won the Venice Film Festival Award for Best Actress, a British Academy Award and Golden Globe Award for her performance. She reunited with Lemmon in Wilder's Irma La Douce (1963), starred in Bob Fosse's Sweet Charity (1969), Hal Ashby's Being There (1979), James L. Brooks' Terms of Endearment (1983), Herbert Ross' Steel Magnolias (1989), Mike Nichols' Postcards from the Edge (1990) and Richard Linklater's Bernie (2011).

Over her career she has earned an Academy Award, two British Academy Film Awards, six Golden Globe Awards, and a Primetime Emmy Award. In 1998 she earned a Golden Globe Cecil B. DeMille Award. She has a star on the Hollywood Walk of Fame and in 2013, President Obama awarded her the Kennedy Center Honors for lifetime contributions to American culture through the performing arts.

Major associations

Academy Awards

British Academy Film Awards

Golden Globe Awards

Primetime Emmy Awards

Screen Actors Guild Awards

Film Festivals

Venice Film Festival

Berlin Film Festival

References 

MacLaine, Shirley